Arase may refer to:

Arase (satellite), formerly known as ERG, a scientific satellite to study Van Allen belts
Arase, Estonia, village in Halinga Parish, Pärnu County, Estonia

People with the surname
, Japanese sumo wrestler
, Japanese water polo player
, Japanese swimmer

Japanese-language surnames